This is a list of television programmes currently, rerunning and formerly on NTV7 in Malaysia.

Home learning plans
 DidikTV KPM

American drama series
 New Girl
 The Simpsons (Season 10 Aired on TV1 in 2006) (Season 11-13, October 2006 to December 2011)
 Grey's Anatomy (Season 1 Aired on TV3 in 2006) (Season 2-7, October 2006 to December 2011)
 Private Practice (3 Seasons - June 2008 to 3 December 2010)
 Suburgatory
 Witches of East End
 The River (U.S. TV series)
 The Blacklist
 Drawn Together
 The Cape
 A to Z (TV series)

Hong Kong drama series

TVB drama series

2012
 Sisters of Pearl (18 September)
 Ghost Writer (27 November)
 Links to Temptation

2013
 Gun Metal Grey (18 January)
 Wax and Wane (10 April)
 The Other Truth (Sponsored by commercial 19 June 10 minute Dymano Koko Krunch Nivea Chipsmore Bio Essence) (19 June)
 Lives of Omission (19 August)
 River of Wine (30 October)
 Forensic Heroes III (25 December)

2014
 The Last Steep Ascent (19 February)
 Gloves Come Off (23 April)
 Daddy Good Deeds (23 June)
 Three Kingdoms RPG (6 August)
 Inbound Troubles (6 October)
 Highs and Lows (1 December)

2015
 The Confidant (9 February)
 Friendly Fire (4 May)
 Slow Boat Home (1 July)
 Triumph in the Skies II (1 September)
 Bounty Lady (15 December)

2016
 Sniper Standoff (1 February)
 Storm in a Cocoon (11 April)
 Ruse of Engagement (22 June)
 Come On, Cousin (22 August)
 Black Heart White Soul (31 October)

2017
 Rear Mirror (9 January)
 Line Walker (27 February)
 Lord of Shanghai (9 May)
 Romantic Repertoire (24 July)
 The Executioner (11 September)
 The Fixer (13 November)
 Momentary Lapse of Reason (27 December)

2018
 Speed of Life (13 February)
 My Dangerous Mafia Retirement Plan (2 April)

TVB Classic drama series

ATV
 The Good Old Days (1996) (Still running; Previously aired in 2009) (Also in 1998 by ntv7's sister channel TV3)
 I Have A Date With Spring (2009, 2011)
 Lady Stealer (2002) (Since 22 August 2011, weekdays from 2:30pm)
 Love in a Miracle (Stars the protagonists of The Good Old Days, weekdays at 2:30pm)

Local drama series

Chinese

 The Liar
 Persona
 The Injustice Stranger
 Superhero at Home
 Pianissimo
 Pulse Of Life (15 February 2016)
 Oppa Oppa (6 April 2016)
 On The Brink II (11 May 2016)
 Malaysian Alice In The Wonderland (4 July 2016)
 Beautiful World (15 July 2016)
 Mind Game
 Secret Lover (20 September 2016)
 Star Avenue (20 December 2016)
 My Twins Lovers (22 December 2016)
 Revolving Heart (14 February 2017)
 I Am Not A Loser (6 April 2017)
 The Memoir Of Majie (20 July 2017)
 The Men in Black School (12 September 2017)
 Away From Home (2015)

Malay
 Dari KL Ke Queenstown (Seasons 1 & 2)
 Elly (Seasons 1 & 2)
 Nafas
 Cik Shopaholic
 Dapur Kongsi
 Vlog Laura
 GIG
 Pontianak Teng Teng
 Idola Kecil Pengembaraan Ben
 Cruise Cinta Lebaran
 Kelab Komedi Ekstra
 Inai Yang Hilang
 5 Jingga
 Cinta Koko Coklat
 Formula Cinta
 Blogger Boy

Hybrid
 Crossings (English and Malay)

Local sitcoms

Malay
 Hartamas
 Spanar Jaya (Seasons 1–10)
 Gol & Gincu The Series (Rerun of former 8TV programme)
 Pesan Makan

Chinese
 Love Compulsory  (Seasons 1-4)
 Mr. Siao's Mandarin Class (Seasons 1 & 2)
 Time FM
 The Easy Path

English
 Kopitiam
 Phua Chu Kang Sdn Bhd
 Show Me The Money
 Small Mission Enterprise

Festive special

Puasa
 Ramadan Sana Sini
 Reality Ramadan Mike
 Wish List Raya
 Meh Raya Meh
 I Heart Kurma
 Syawal Mencari Cinta
 Family Showdown Raya
 Kasi Gegar Raya
 Istanbul Aku Datang
 The Sarimah Show Raya

Chinese New Year
 Into The Phoenix

Fitness programme
 Fit and Fab
 Fitness First Class

Singaporean TV series

English
Drama series
 The Kitchen Musical
 Mata-Mata
 Living with Lydia
 Parental Guidance
 Phua Chu Kang
 Under One Roof
Chinese
 The Champion
 The Oath
 Tiger Mom (TV series)
 A Tale of 2 Cities
 Break Free
 The Dream Job

Drama

 If Only I Could (TV series) (16 August 2016)
 C.L.I.F. 4
 Hero (2017)
 Home Truly (2018)

Latin America

Telenovela

Taiwan TV series

Hokkien Drama series

Idol drama
 My Fair Princess (2009)
 It Started with a Kiss (July 2011)
 Corner With Love (11 August 2011) 
 Monga Yao Hui (15 August 2011)

Taiwan Variety show
 King of the Show

Variety Show
English
 A to Z
 Best in The World (Repeat on 1 November 2020) (Every Sunday from 8:00pm to 8:30pm) (Multiple Season) 
 Splatalot!
 Fuzz Food
 Mad Markets
 The Disko Baldi Show
 Hip Hoppin Asia (Repeat of former 8TV programme)
 Kan Cheong Kitchen (Repeat of former 8TV programme)
 Japanizi: Going, Going, Gong!
 Just for Laughs: Gags
 Oprah's Big Give
 Little Big Shots
 America's Funniest Home Videos
 The Amazing Race
 Life's Funniest Moments
 Deal or No Deal Malaysia
 Fear Factor Malaysia
 The Firm
 Go Travel (Also aired on TV9 and Awesome TV) (Formerly in TV2)
 Sounds of Muslims
 Eco Traveller
 Supper Heroes
 Fly TV 2018
 Thursday Night Live
 Take me out Malaysia
 Fort Boyard (TV series)
 Pop Rumble
 Bella
 Off The Hook
 Rooftop

Hybrid
 Taste of Malaysia Martin Yan (English and Chinese)

Malay
 Kail X (5 January 2021) (Every Tuesday 9:00pm to 9:30pm) (Reality Television)
 Switch Off
 Fuzz Food
 Skuad Pasar Malam
 Festival Jurnal Kembara Dunia
 Seekers
 Pop! TV (formerly in TV9)
 Feel Good Show
 It's Alif!
 Drop The Beat (Originally planned for broadcast on TV3)
 I Can See Your Voice Malaysia (Originally planned for broadcast on TV3)
 Edisi Siasat
 Wakenabeb
 Rojak
 Selera Sado
 Bila Bujang Masuk Dapur
 The Sherry Show
 The Streets
 Apa Nak Makan Ni
 Kata Serasi?
 Roda Impian
 Actorlympics TV
 NTV7 special
 Destinasi G4
 Makan Angin
 Lari Kita Kejar Dia
 Lari 2015
 Ke Indonesia Ke Kita?
 Ke Jepun Ke Kita?
 Woot Woot 2013
 Bang Bang Boom

Mandarin
 My Man Can
 If You Are the One (game show)
 Mandarin Battle Star (2010–2016) (Chinese Primary school students quiz show sponsored by Besta and later Vitagen)
 e7
 Project CSR
 Hey! Shoot Out! (Saturday night and show time)
 Variety Get Together
 Unsolved Mysterious
 Edition Investigate Mandarin (Chinese version of Edisi Siasat)
 Star Idol Malaysia
 Foodie Blogger
 Helping Hands (Sponsored by sports toto)
 Finding Angel
 Aunty Must Go Crazy
 Yummy Trail
 Women's Zone
 Super Smart (Chinese High school students quiz show) (Reality Television)
 Deal or No Deal Malaysia Chinese
 Global Watch (Moved to 8TV due to rebrand)
 Battle of the Best Singapore
 Wo Men San
 Kids Ask Big Questions
 Mars vs Venus
 All About Sports
 Feel Good Feel Cook
 Project Sunshine
 Guess Who
 7 Zoom In
 Chong Feng Zhen Xian
 Heart Talk
 Editor's Time

Korean
 Produce 101 (formerly in TV9)
 Running Man (also aired on TV2) and (formerly in TV9)
 I Can See Your Voice Korea (formerly in TV9)

Talk show
 NTV7 Breakfast Show (Monday to Friday from 8:00am to 10:00am)

2018
 Feel Good Show. Discontinued in 2019 due to CJ WOW SHOP airtime on NTV7, final episode aired on 28 December 2018. (Daily, 8:00am)
 Viewpoint (2018 Malaysian general election special) (Special programmes regarding Malaysia 14th general election)

2021
 Breakfast@9pm 2021 (January) (Monday 9:00pm to 9:30pm)
 Money Matters (January) (Exact date: Unknown) (Friday 9:00pm to 9:30pm) (Repeated programme from TV3) (also on TV3)
 Soal Drama (2 January) (Tuesday, 9:00pm to 9:30pm)
 Topik@7 (2 January) (Saturday 9:00pm to 9:30pm)
 Edisi Siasat (3 January) (Sunday 9:00pm to 9:30pm)
 T.O.P (Trio On Point) (4 January) (Monday to Wednesday 6:00pm to 7:00pm)

News
 7 Edition (English) (Daily from 8:00pm to 9:00pm) (Effective 1 December 2020, broadcasting timeslot change to 8:00pm to 9:00pm, instead of previous broadcast timeslot which is from 8:00pm to 8:30pm) (Cease broadcasting on 17 February 2021, replaced by Didik TV)
 Buletin Didik (Malay) (Daily from 7:30pm to 8:00pm), (Repeated daily broadcast on the following day from 12:00pm to 12:30pm) (Broadcasting since 17 February 2021) 
 Edisi 7 (Malay) (Daily from 7:30pm to 8:00pm) (Effective in December 2020, broadcasting timeslot change to 12:00pm to 12:30pm, instead of previous broadcast timeslot which is from 7:30pm to 8:00pm.) (Cease broadcasting on 17 February 2021, replaced by Buletin Didik broadcasting daily from 7:30pm to 8:00pm)
 Mandarin 7 (Chinese) (Daily from 5:00pm to 6:00pm) (Cease broadcasting on 8 June 2020, merge with 8TV Mandarin News)

Turkish
 New Bride - Yeni Gelin
 Brave and Beautiful - Cesur ve Güzel

British
 Mr. Bean

Korean drama

Dubbed in Mandarin

Original language

 A Girl Who Sees Smells - 5 March 2018
 Hogu's Love - 5 April 2018
 Doctors - 10 May 2018
 Suits - 16 May 2018
 The Bride of Habaek - 20 June 2018
 The Liar and His Lover - 27 July 2018
 Because This is My First Life - 31 August 2018

Mainland Chinese
 Journey to the West (2011 TV series)
 Pretty Li Hui Zhen
 City Still Believe In Love
 Love Actually

Kid's/Cartoon programmes

 Rabbids Invasion
 Crayon Shinchan
 Doraemon
 Regal Academy
 PAW Patrol
 Shimmer and Shine
 Dora the Explorer (moves to TV3)
 Kaleido Star
 Kamen Rider Series
 Kamen Rider Ryuki
 Kamen Rider Faiz
 Kamen Rider Blade
 Kamen Rider Hibiki
 Kamen Rider Kabuto
 Kamen Rider Den-O
 Kamen Rider Kiva
 Kamen Rider Decade
 Kamen Rider W
 Kamen Rider OOO
 Kamen Rider Fourze
 Power Rangers
 Power Rangers Jungle Fury
 Power Rangers RPM
 Power Rangers Samurai
 Power Rangers Super Samurai
 Power Rangers Megaforce
 Power Rangers Dino Charge
 Power Rangers Dino Supercharge
 Super Sentai
 Tensou Sentai Goseiger
 Zyuden Sentai Kyoryuger (moved to TV3 during rerun at 31 December 2018)
 Blaze and the Monster Machines
 Hi-5 (moved to Astro TVIQ & Disney Junior Asia) 
 BoBoiBoy
 Oggy and the Cockroaches (moved to Awesome TV) 
 Pocket Dragon Adventures
 Transformers: Prime
 My Little Pony: Friendship is Magic 
 Mr. Bean: The Animated Series (moved to Awesome TV) 
 Horrivle Stories
 My Life Me
 Ultraman
 Ultraman Tiga
 Ultraman Dyna
 Ultraman Gaia
 Ultraman Neos
 Ultraman Cosmos
 Yo Gabba Gabba!
 Kappa Mikey
 El Tigre: The Adventures of Manny Rivera
 Johnny Test
 The Amazing World of Gumball
 CJ The DJ (also aired on TV2) 
 Justice League (TV series)
 Lego series
 Lego Friends - Girls on A Mission
 Lego Ninjago (Malay dubbed)
 Lego Monkie Kid: a Hero Is Born (also aired on TV3 & 8TV) (Chinese dubbed)
 OOglies 
 Samurai Jack
 The Powerpuff Girls (moved to RTM2)

Anime
 Slam Dunk
 Sailor Moon
 Sailor Moon R
 Sonic X
 Trinity Blood
 Kekkaishi
 You're Under Arrest
 The Melancholy of Haruhi Suzumiya
 K-On!
 Doraemon
 Sailor Moon Crystal  (moved to TA-DAA!)
 Naruto
 Dr. Rin!
 Dragon Ball Z Kai
 Naruto Shippuden
 Attack on Titan
 Captain Tsubasa: Road to 2002

 Accel World
 Maid-Sama
 Yu-Gi-Oh
 One Piece
 Naruto
 Dragon Ball Super
 Super Yo-Yo
 Tsubasa Chronicles
 Digimon Adventure
 Dinosaur King
 Pokémon
 Fairy Tail (Season 1)
 Keroro Gunsou
 Inazuma Eleven
 Yokai Watch
 Sword Art Online
 Battle B-Daman
 UFO baby
 Medabots
 Get Backers
 Chibi Maruko Chan

Award shows

2010
 Golden Awards (also in 2012, 2014, 2017)
 62nd Primetime Emmy Awards
 67th Golden Globe Awards

Sports
 2014 Commonwealth Games (with TV3)

References

ntv7
ntv7 Programmes